Gustaf Wally (24 November 1905 – 3 March 1966) dancer, actor and theatre manager was born Gustaf Wallenberg. He was a member of the industrialist Wallenberg family.

He formed the dance troupe the Wally brothers along with Niels Bagge-Wessel. In the 1930s, Gustaf Wally participated in shows by Karl Gerhard and Kar de Mumma. He was the head of "Södra Teatern" in Stockholm from 1939 to 1941, and "Oscarsteatern"  from 1942 to 1947. He made ten records and took part in seven movies.

Selected filmography
 The Dangerous Game (1933)
 Som du vill ha mej (1943)

Swedish male stage actors
1905 births
1966 deaths
Swedish male dancers
Swedish theatre managers and producers
20th-century Swedish male actors
Gustaf Wally
Swedish male film actors